German submarine U-754 was a Type VIIC U-boat deployed by Nazi Germany's Kriegsmarine during the Second World War against allied shipping in the Atlantic Ocean. She was a successful but short-lived boat, sinking 13 ships during her career. She was most notorious for her final attack, in which she shelled and sank the small fishing vessel Ebb, and killed a number of its crew with machine-gun fire as they attempted to launch a life raft. She was sunk with all hands by a Royal Canadian Air Force bomber three days later on 31 July 1942.

U-754 was built in the Kriegsmarinewerft at the main fleet base of Wilhelmshaven in Northern Germany on the North Sea. She was completed on 28 August 1941, and given to the experienced Kapitänleutnant Hans Oestermann to command. Following her work-up period in which the boat was tested and the crew trained, she was despatched on her first patrol.

Design
German Type VIIC submarines were preceded by the shorter Type VIIB submarines. U-754 had a displacement of  when at the surface and  while submerged. She had two shafts and two  propellers.

U-754 was fitted with five  torpedo tubes (four fitted at the bow and one at the stern), fourteen torpedoes, one  SK C/35 naval gun, 220 rounds, and a  C/30 anti-aircraft gun. The boat had a complement of between forty-four and sixty.

Service history

First patrol
U-754 departed Kiel on her first patrol on 30 December 1941, and her operating area was primarily in the mouth of the St Lawrence River, operating against convoys entering or leaving the waterway, or destined for the many ports at the river's mouth, such as Halifax, Nova Scotia or St. John's, Newfoundland. During this patrol, she sank four freighters. The submarine narrowly escaped a bombing attack by a Royal Canadian Air Force Bolingbroke bomber on 23 March which inflicted minor damage. The submarine returned to Brest in France on 2 February to resupply and rearm.

Second patrol
The second patrol left from Brest on 9 March 1942, and after a brief sweep in her previous area of operations, she swung south to take advantage of the Second happy time then occurring off the United States's Eastern Seaboard. During this patrol she sank seven more ships; three of them in one attack on a small coastal convoy, in which she hit several small barges and coastal cargo ships. She sank the tanker  by torpedo on 23 March. U-754 returned to Brest on 25 April 1942.

Third patrol
Her final patrol was her least successful, in terms of ships sunk, although the tonnage was higher, as she sunk the 12,435 GRT Waiwera in the mid-Atlantic on 29 June, ten days after leaving Brest.

Attack on Ebb
It was nearly a month later, on 28 July, that U-754 scored her final victim, when she controversially shelled the fishing vessel Ebb near Cape Sable Island, Nova Scotia.

Ebb was a motor fishing trawler operating out of Boston for the General Sea Foods Company. The crew of the small 260 GRT vessel felt it was unlikely that they would be troubled by the war, as she was far too small for an effective torpedo shot, and too insignificant to justify the risk of a surface attack by gunfire. On 28 July 1942, however, while fishing off Cape Sable her crew were shocked to see U-754 emerge from the water.

The submarine immediately opened fire without warning on Ebb with her anti-aircraft guns. The ship stopped and made signals that they had surrendered, but the gunfire continued, one gun sweeping through the crowd of crew members attempting to launch the ship's life raft. Five of the seventeen crew were killed and seven more seriously wounded, before Ebb sank after taking over fifty hits. The survivors were discovered and rescued by the W-class destroyer  fourteen hours later.

Had U-754s crew survived the war, it is possible that they would have been charged with war crimes as were the officers of  who also fired on sailors who had abandoned their ship.

RCAF attack and sinking

Radio transmissions from U-754 betrayed a pattern to Royal Canadian Navy intelligence, information which was used by Norville Everett Small the commander of RCAF 113 Squadron to deploy patrols from RCAF Station Yarmouth targeting the suspected position of U-754.

On 31 July, a Hudson bomber piloted by Squadron Leader Small himself caught U-754 on the surface south of Yarmouth not far from the scene of the Ebb sinking. The submarine was precisely straddled by a cluster of depth charges as it began to dive. The conning tower of the wounded submarine briefly surfaced to be strafed by the Hudson's machine guns before submerging for the last time.

A trail of large air bubbles was followed by a massive underwater explosion as U-754 went to the bottom with all 43 hands. It marked the first submarine kill of the RCAF's Eastern Air Command.

Wolfpacks
U-754 took part in one wolfpack, namely:
 Zieten (6 – 22 January 1942)

Summary of raiding history

References

Bibliography

 Bridgland, Tony, Waves of Hate, Leo Cooper, Great Britain: 2002. .

External links

World War II submarines of Germany
German Type VIIC submarines
Shipwrecks of the Nova Scotia coast
U-boats sunk by Canadian aircraft
U-boats commissioned in 1941
U-boats sunk in 1942
World War II shipwrecks in the Atlantic Ocean
1941 ships
U-boats sunk by depth charges
Ships built in Wilhelmshaven
Ships lost with all hands
Maritime incidents in July 1942